This is a list of college athletics programs in the U.S. state of North Carolina.

NCAA

Division I

Division II

Division III

NAIA

USCAA

NCCAA

NJCAA

See also
List of NCAA Division I institutions
List of NCAA Division II institutions
List of NCAA Division III institutions
List of NAIA institutions
List of USCAA institutions
List of NCCAA institutions
List of college athletic programs by U.S. state

North Carolina
College sports in North Carolina
College athletic programs
College athletic programs